Blaž Brezovački (born 29 April 1987) is a Slovenian football midfielder.

External links 

1987 births
Living people
Footballers from Ljubljana
Slovenian footballers
Association football midfielders
NK Olimpija Ljubljana (1945–2005) players
Slovenian expatriate footballers
Expatriate footballers in Portugal
Slovenian expatriate sportspeople in Portugal
Slovenian PrvaLiga players
S.L. Benfica footballers
NK IB 1975 Ljubljana players
NK Ivančna Gorica players
NK Nafta Lendava players
NK Domžale players
NK Aluminij players
Slovenia youth international footballers
Slovenia under-21 international footballers